Lilia Landi (born 24 August 1929) is a retired Italian film actress.

Selected filmography
 My Beautiful Daughter (1950)
 Turri il bandito (1950)
 Era lui... sì! sì! (1951)
 Licenza premio (1951)
 Destiny (1951)
 The White Sheik (1952)
 Abracadabra (1952)
 Frine, Courtesan of Orient (1953)
 Milanese in Naples (1954)
 Il Grido (1957)

References

Bibliography
 Frank Burke. Fellini's Films: From Postwar to Postmodern. Twayne Publishers, 1996.

External links

1929 births
Living people
Italian film actresses
Actresses from Rome